This page details the broadcasters for the Toronto Blue Jays Major League Baseball team.

Television
Sportsnet
Buck Martinez, play-by-play announcer, colour commentator (2010–present) (former colour commentator on TSN 1987–2000)
Dan Shulman, play-by-play announcer (2016–present) (50 games per season; formerly on TSN 1995–2001)
Jamie Campbell, studio host (2010-present) (former play-by-play announcer on Rogers Sportsnet (2005–2009)
Joe Siddall, studio analyst (2018–present)
Hazel Mae, field-level reporter (2015-present)

TVA Sports (French)
 Denis Casavant, play-by-play (2022–present)
 Rodger Brulotte, colour commentator (2011–present)

Radio
Sportsnet 590 the Fan / Toronto Blue Jays Radio Network
Ben Wagner, play-by-play announcer (2018–2020, August 2021–present)
Simulcast of Sportsnet TV audio (April–July 2021)

Former

Radio
Alan Ashby, play-by-play and colour commentator (2007–2012)
Kevin Barker, occasional colour commentator (2018–2020)
Tom Cheek, play-by-play announcer (1977–2004) (deceased; 2013 Ford C. Frick Award winner)
Dirk Hayhurst, substitute colour commentator (2013)
Jerry Howarth, play-by-play announcer (1981–2017)
Gary Matthews, colour commentator (2000–2001)
Jack Morris, colour commentator (2013)
Warren Sawkiw, colour commentator (2005–2006)
Joe Siddall, colour commentator (2014–2017)
Duane Ward, substitute colour commentator (2014–2017)
Mike Wilner, secondary play-by-play announcer (2002–2020) and studio host
Early Wynn, colour commentator (1977–1981) (deceased)

Television
Alan Ashby, substitute play-by-play and colour commentator (2007–2012) 
Jesse Barfield, colour commentator (2007–2008)
Rod Black, play-by-play announcer (1999–2009)
Tom Candiotti, colour commentator (2005–2006)
Joe Carter, colour commentator (1999–2000)
John Cerutti, colour commentator (1997–2004) (deceased)
Don Chevrier, play-by-play announcer (1977–1996) (deceased)
Matt Devlin, occasional play-by-play announcer (2013–present)
Jacques Doucet, French-language play-by-play announcer (2011–2022)
Rob Faulds, play-by-play announcer (2001–2004), occasional play-by-play announcer (2012-15)
Darrin Fletcher, colour commentator (2005–2009)
Whitey Ford, colour commentator (1977) (deceased)
Elliotte Friedman, play-by-play announcer (2007–2008)
Jim Hughson, play-by-play announcer (1990–1994, 2007–2008) (then lead play-by-play announcer with Hockey Night in Canada)
Tommy Hutton, colour commentator (1990–1996)
Tony Kubek, colour commentator (1977–1989) (2009 Ford C. Frick Award winner)
Tom McKee, Host, field reporter, Producer of Blue Jays Baseball (1977–1992) (2013 George Gross Career Achievement Award)
Rance Mulliniks, colour commentator (2005–2010)
Fergie Olver, play-by-play announcer, field reporter, and host (1981–1996)
Ken Singleton, colour commentator (1985–1986)
Pat Tabler, colour commentator (2001–2022)
Brian Williams, play-by-play announcer (1993–2002)
Gregg Zaun, studio analyst (2011–2017)

Chronology

Television

1990s

1980s

Radio

1990s

See also
 MLB on TSN
 List of current Major League Baseball announcers
 List of Toronto Maple Leafs broadcasters
 List of Toronto Raptors broadcasters

References

External links
Bluejays.com: Broadcasters

Toronto Blue Jays
 
Toronto Blue Jays broadcasters
Toronto Blue Jays broadcasters
Broadcasters
Toronto Blue Jays broadcasters
Toronto Blue Jays broadcasters